Noodles are a type of food made from unleavened dough which is either rolled flat and cut, stretched, or extruded, into long strips or strings. Noodles are a staple food in many cultures (for example, Chinese noodles, Filipino noodles, Indonesian noodles, Japanese noodles, Korean noodles, Vietnamese noodles, and Long and medium length Italian pasta) and made into a variety of shapes.

While long, thin strips may be the most common, many varieties of noodles are cut into waves, helices, tubes, strings, or shells, or folded over, or cut into other shapes. Noodles are usually cooked in boiling water, sometimes with cooking oil or salt added. They are often pan-fried or deep-fried. Noodles are often served with an accompanying sauce or in a soup. Noodles can be refrigerated for short-term storage or dried and stored for future use.

Etymology 
The word for noodles in English, was borrowed in the 18th century from the German word Nudel.

History

Origin
The earliest written record of noodles is found in a book dated to the Eastern Han period (25–220 CE). Noodles made from wheat dough became a prominent food for the people of the Han dynasty. The oldest evidence of noodles was from 4,000 years ago in China. In 2005, a team of archaeologists reported finding an earthenware bowl that contained 4000-year-old noodles at the Lajia archaeological site. These noodles were said to resemble lamian, a type of Chinese noodle. Analyzing the husk phytoliths and starch grains present in the sediment associated with the noodles, they were identified as millet belonging to Panicum miliaceum and Setaria italica. However, other researchers cast doubt that Lajia's noodles were made from specifically millet: it is difficult to make pure millet noodles, it is unclear whether the analyzed residue were directly derived from Lajia's noodles themselves, starch morphology after cooking shows distinctive alterations that does not fit with Lajia's noodles, and it is uncertain whether the starch-like grains from Laijia's noodles are starch as they show some non-starch characteristics.

Food historians generally estimate that pasta's origin is from among the Mediterranean countries: a homogenous mixture of flour and water called itrion as described by 2nd century Greek physician Galen, among 3rd to 5th century Palestinians as itrium as described by the Jerusalem Talmud and as itriyya (Arabic cognate of the Greek word), string-like shapes made of semolina and dried before cooking as defined by the 9th century Aramean physician and lexicographer Isho bar Ali.

Historical variations

East Asia
Wheat noodles in Japan (udon) were adapted from a Chinese recipe as early as the 9th century. Innovations continued, such as noodles made with buckwheat (naengmyeon) were developed in the Joseon Dynasty of Korea (1392–1897). Ramen noodles, based on southern Chinese noodle dishes from Guangzhou but named after the northern Chinese lamian, became common in Japan by 1900.

Central Asia
Kesme or erişte noodles were eaten by Turkic peoples by the 13th century.

West Asia
Ash reshteh (noodles in thick soup with herbs) is one of the most popular dishes in some middle eastern countries such as Iran, which was brought through Turco-Mongol.

Europe
In the 1st century BCE, Horace wrote of fried sheets of dough called lagana. However, the cooking method doesn't correspond to the current definition of either a fresh or dry pasta product.

Italy
The first concrete information on pasta products in Italy dates to the 13th or 14th centuries. Pasta has taken on a variety of shapes, often based on regional specializations.

Germany
In Germany, documents dating from 1725 mention Spätzle.  Medieval illustrations are believed to place this noodle at an even earlier date.

Ancient Israel and diaspora
The Latinized word itrium referred to a kind of boiled dough.  Arabs adapted noodles for long journeys in the fifth century, the first written record of dry pasta. Muhammad al-Idrisi wrote in 1154 that itriyya was manufactured and exported from Norman Sicily.  Itriya was also known by the Persian Jews during early Persian rule (when they spoke Aramaic) and during Islamic rule.  It referred to a small soup noodle, of Greek origin, prepared by twisting bits of kneaded dough into shape, resembling Italian orzo.

Polish Jews
Zacierki is a type of noodle found in Polish Jewish cuisine.
It was part of the rations distributed to Jewish victims in the Łódź Ghetto by the Nazis.
(Out of the "major ghettos", Łódź was the most affected by hunger, starvation and malnutrition-related deaths.)
The diary of a young Jewish girl from Łódź recounts a fight she had with her father over a spoonful of zacierki taken from the family's meager supply of 200 grams a week.

Types by primary ingredient

Wheat
Bakmi: Indonesian Chinese yellow wheat noodles with egg and meat, usually pork. The Chinese word bak (肉), which means "meat" (or more specifically pork), is the vernacular pronunciation in Hokkien, but not in Teochew (which pronounced it as nek), suggesting an original Hokkien root. Mi derives from miàn. In Chinese, miàn (simplified Chinese: 面; traditional Chinese: 麵; often transliterated as "mien" or "mein") refers to noodles made from wheat.
 Chūka men (中華麺): Japanese for "Chinese noodles", used for ramen, champon, and yakisoba
Kesme: flat, yellow or reddish brown Central Asian wheat noodles
Kalguksu (칼국수): knife-cut Korean noodles
Lamian (拉麵): hand-pulled Chinese noodles
Mee pok (麪薄): flat, yellow Chinese noodles, common in Southeast Asia
Long Pasta: Italian noodles typically made from durum wheat (semolina)
Reshte: Central Asian, flat noodle, very pale in colour (almost white) used in Persian and Afghani cuisine
Sōmen (そうめん): thin variety of Japanese wheat noodles, often coated with vegetable oil
Thukpa: flat Tibetan noodles
Udon (うどん): thicker variety of Japanese wheat noodles
Kishimen (きしめん): flat variety of Japanese wheat noodles

Rice

Bánh phở, Vietnamese name of the Chinese rice noodles ho fun 河粉 .
Flat or thick rice noodles, also known as hé fěn or ho fun (河粉), kway teow (粿條) or sen yai (เส้นใหญ่)
Rice vermicelli: thin rice noodles, also known as mǐfěn (米粉) or bee hoon or sen mee (เส้นหมี่) or "bún"
Sevai, a variant of rice vermicelli common in South India
Idiyappam is an Indian rice noodle
Mixian and migan noodles of southwest China
Khanom chin is a fermented rice noodle used in Thai cuisine

Buckwheat
Makguksu (막국수): local specialty of Gangwon Province in South Korea
Memil naengmyeon (메밀 냉면): Korean noodles made of buckwheat, slightly more chewy than soba
Soba (蕎麦): Japanese buckwheat noodles
Pizzoccheri: Italian buckwheat tagliatelle from Valtellina, usually served with a melted cheese sauce

Egg
Egg noodles are made of a mixture of egg and flour.
Youmian or thin noodles: Asian egg noodles common throughout China and Southeast Asia
Lokshen: wide egg noodles used in Eastern European Jewish cuisine
Kesme or erişte: Turkic egg noodles
Spätzle: Egg noodle generally associated with the southern German states of Baden-Württemberg and Bavaria

Others
Acorn noodles, also known as dotori guksu (도토리국수) in Korean, are made of acorn meal, wheat flour, wheat germ, and salt.
Olchaeng-i guksu, meaning tadpole noodles, are made of corn soup put through a noodle maker right into cold water. It was named for its features. These Korean noodles are mostly eaten in Gangwon-do.
Cellophane noodles are made from mung bean. These can also be made from potato starch, canna starch or various starches of the same genre.
Chilk naengmyeon (칡 냉면): Korean noodles made of starch from kudzu root, known as kuzuko in Japanese, chewy and semitransparent.
Shirataki noodles (しらたき): Japanese noodles made of konjac (devil's tongue).
Kelp noodles, made from seaweed.
Mie jagung, Indonesian noodles made from corn starch.
Mie sagu, Indonesian noodles made from sagu.
Mie singkong or mie mocaf, Indonesian noodles made from cassava.

Types of dishes

Baked noodles: Boiled and drained noodles are combined with other ingredients and baked. Common examples include many casseroles.
Basic noodles: These are cooked in water or broth, then drained. Other foods can be added or the noodles are added to other foods (see fried noodles) or the noodles can be served plain with a dipping sauce or oil to be added at the table. In general, noodles are soft and absorb flavors.
Chilled noodles: noodles that are served cold, sometimes in a salad. Examples include Thai glass noodle salad and cold udon.
Fried noodles: dishes made of noodles stir fried with various meats, seafood, vegetables, and dairy products. Typical examples include chow mein, lo mein, mie goreng, hokkien mee, some varieties of pancit, yakisoba, Curry Noodles, and pad thai.
Noodle soup: noodles served in broth. Examples are phở, beef noodle soup, chicken noodle soup, ramen, laksa, mie ayam, saimin, and batchoy.

Preservation
Instant noodles
Frozen noodles

See also

References

Bibliography

 
 Errington, Frederick et al. eds. The Noodle Narratives: The Global Rise of an Industrial Food into the Twenty-First Century (U. of California Press; 2013) 216 pages; studies three markets for instant noodles: Japan, the United States, and Papua New Guinea.

External links 
 

 
 
Ancient dishes
Chinese inventions
East Asian cuisine
Staple foods